Roberta Day Quimby is a fictional character created by American children's author Beverly Cleary. Named after her father, Robert Quimby, Roberta is the youngest of three Quimby children; Beezus Quimby is the eldest and Ramona Quimby, Beezus' best friend, is the middle child. In addition to her mother, father and sisters, she also has an aunt, uncle and cousin. She is introduced in the book Ramona Forever, and is one year old in the last book Ramona's World. Roberta has a playful personality, and she seems to be taking after Ramona. She was played by twins Aila and Zanti McCubbing in the 2010 film adaptation, Ramona and Beezus. There is currently no merchandise for Roberta, as she is a minor character.

Roberta was included in the 1988 television series Ramona, which ran for a total of ten episodes. The series follows third grader Ramona Quimby portrayed by actress Sarah Polley and her struggles with everyday life. Roberta, did not appear until the tenth and final episode of the series, Siblingitis. Her actress was unknown. In the books, the family of five lives on Klickitat Street, which is an actual street in  Portland, Oregon. In Grant Park, there are statues of Ramona, Ribsy, and Henry with plaques naming all the books in the Ramona and Henry Huggins series.

Roberta in the books
Roberta has a minor role in the series, first appearing in Ramona Forever. She only appeared in the last two books before the conclusion of the series. Roberta was apparently born around June or July. Little Roberta is the smallest Quimby in the household; it takes a lot of work to care for her. The first time Ramona tries to feed Roberta, Roberta spits peas on her face. Roberta did learn one thing from her sister Ramona: how to stick out her tongue. Roberta made her final appearance in Ramona's World, the last installment of the series of eight books. Roberta has a playful and fun-loving personality. In the final book, Roberta got her head stuck inside a cat scratching post and Ramona tried everything to get her out. The one thing she manages was to do it while reciting Roberta's favorite nursery rhyme "Three Little Kittens".

See also

Mr. Robert Quimby
Mrs. Dorothy Quimby
Beezus Quimby
Ramona Quimby
Howie Kemp
Ramona and Beezus
Ramona (1988 TV series)
Beezus and Ramona

References

External links

Ramona at Teachnet Miami
Ramona Quimby, a play
Childrens Theater Company on Ramona Quimby

Original 'Ramona' Sarah Polley hopes revamped character isn't 'too cute' 
Ramona and Beezus Mother and Daughter Film Review

Beverly Cleary characters
Child characters in literature
Female characters in literature
Literary characters introduced in 1984
Characters in American novels of the 20th century